South Fork Rio Grande is a tributary of the Rio Grande in southern Colorado in the United States.  It flows from a source in the Weminuche Wilderness of the San Juan Mountains to a confluence with the Rio Grande at the town of South Fork in Rio Grande County, Colorado.

See also

 List of rivers of Colorado

References

External links

Rivers of Colorado
Rivers of Rio Grande County, Colorado
Rivers of Mineral County, Colorado